Anders is a given name and a surname of Scandinavian origin.

Anders may also refer to:

 Anders (crater) on the Moon
 4815 Anders, an asteroid
 Anders Peak, a mountain in Antarctica
 WPB Anders, a family of Polish medium tracked combat vehicles
 Socialistische Partij Anders, a Flemish political party in Belgium
 Anders (singer), Canadian singer Anders Ly (born 1995)
 Anders (Dragon Age), a character in the Dragon Age series

See also
 Anders Army, a World War II Eastern Front unit
 Ander